Robert S. "Sonny" Parker (born March 22, 1955) is an American former professional basketball player who played small forward and shooting guard for the Golden State Warriors of the National Basketball Association (NBA). He was drafted in the first round of the NBA draft after attending and playing basketball at Texas A&M University. After retiring from basketball, Parker created the Sonny Parker Youth Foundation in Chicago to help inner-city students.

Early years
Parker was born in Chicago, Illinois and attended Chicago's Farragut High School, where he received All-City, All-State, and All-Public League honors. In appreciation of his efforts on the school's basketball team, he has been named to the Farragut Hall of Fame, the Chicago Public Schools Hall of Fame, and the Illinois High School Hall of Fame.

After graduating from high school, Parker spent two years at Mineral Area College. In both of his seasons, Parker was named an All-American, as well as Conference Player of the Year and Region Player of the Year. He was an All-Conference and All-Region pick, and is the Mineral Area College's Leading Career Scorer. He has been inducted into the National Junior College Hall of Fame. The 1973 team won the conference championship.

College career

Although Parker was recruited by many of the top college basketball programs, he chose to attend Texas A&M University, primarily to learn under legendary coach Shelby Metcalf. The lonely Parker, over 1000 miles from home, was quickly embraced by Metcalf and his family, often accompanying his coach on fishing trips. The men became close enough friends that after Parker was named the most valuable player in one of the many college tournaments in which A&M participated, he gave his reward, a nice watch, to Metcalf as a gift. Metcalf treasured the watch for twenty-five years, before giving it to Parker's son Christian at the ceremony inducting Parker into the Texas A&M Athletic Hall of Fame. At Metcalf's funeral in February 2007, Parker gave a eulogy and served as one of the pallbearers.

In his two years at Texas A&M, Parker led the Aggies to back-to-back Southwest Conference titles, earning himself first-team All-Southwest Conference honors both years as well. The team reached the NCAA Tournament in 1974-1975. As a senior, Parker averaged 20.7 points per game, a feat that only two other Aggie players have achieved in the 20 years since he left.

Honors
Newcomer of the Year
All Conference
All Defensive Team
Texas A&M MVP
SWC All Decade Team
All American
Pizza Hut-Slam Dunk Award
All Star Game
Texas A&M Hall of Fame

Professional career
Parker was a first-round draft pick, chosen by the Golden State Warriors as the 17th overall pick in the 1976 NBA Draft. For 29 years, Parker held the record as the highest an Aggie had ever been drafted, until in 2005 Antoine Wright was chosen as the 15th overall draft pick by the New Jersey Nets.

In his rookie season, Parker played in 65 games, scoring a total of 379 points (5.8 points per game), with 2.7 rebounds per game and .9 assists per game. His team reached the playoffs, with Parker contributing 4.2 points per game and 2.8 rebounds, and .9 assists per game.

The following season, Parker played in 82 games, averaging 11.4 points per game, 4.7 rebounds, and 1.9 assists. He ranked 16th in the NBA for Field Goal Percentage, with .519 field goals (406 out of 783). His best season, however, came in 1978-1979, where he averaged 15.2 points, 5.7 rebounds, and 3.7 assists per game, with 144 steals and 33 blocks.

In a thrilling game in November 1981, Parker led the Warriors to a 102-100 victory over the Houston Rockets. At the opening of the final quarter, the Warriors trailed by 10 points before Parker and teammate Joe Hassett combined to score 13 points and give the Warriors their first lead with 3 minutes left to play. The game was tied at 100 when Parker rebounded a shot by his teammate Lloyd Free with two seconds remaining and completed a reverse layup to give the Warriors their victory.

After a disappointing 1981-82 season, where Parker averaged only 3.9 points, 2.5 rebounds, and 2.1 assists per game, in September 1982 the Warriors waived Parker, ending his NBA career.

For the six years that he played professional basketball, Parker averaged 9.9 points, 4.1 rebounds, and 2.1 assists per game.

Youth Foundation
In 1990, Parker established the non-profit Sonny Parker Youth Foundation (SPYF) in his hometown of Chicago. The foundation is designed to provide year-round educational, recreational, and multi-cultural programs for inner-city children from kindergarten through 12th grade. Through after-school and weekend programs, the foundation provides tutoring, ACT/SAT preparation, parents' workshops, job training, mentoring, career planning, and physical education in the hopes of improving the reading and writing skills of the students and preparing them to become more productive citizens. Parker is the president of the organization and is active in its daily activities.

Personal life
Parker and his wife, Lola, have seven children. Parker's son Christian played at BYU-Hawaii before serving an LDS mission in Atlanta, Georgia; upon return he finished his career at the College of Southern Idaho. He then enrolled at the University of Washington; he aspires to become a collegiate basketball coach. Parker's eldest son, Darryl, is a graduate of the University of Oregon and played professional basketball overseas. He is now a Chicago police officer. Parker's son Jabari is a former Duke basketball player who was selected by the Milwaukee Bucks with the 2nd pick in the 2014 NBA draft.  Sonny was afflicted with kidney problems that require dialysis, making it difficult for him to attend Jabari's games.

References

External links

Sonny Parker Youth Foundation

1955 births
Living people
20th-century African-American sportspeople
21st-century African-American people
African-American basketball players
American men's basketball players
Basketball players from Chicago
Farragut Career Academy alumni
Golden State Warriors draft picks
Golden State Warriors players
Junior college men's basketball players in the United States
Mineral Area College alumni
Small forwards
Texas A&M Aggies men's basketball players